Domingo Garcia Bryant (born December 8, 1963) is a former American football defensive back who played two seasons with the Houston Oilers of the National Football League (NFL). He was drafted by the Pittsburgh Steelers in the sixth round of the 1986 NFL Draft. Bryant played college football at Texas A&M University and attended Garrison High School in Garrison, Texas. He was also a member of the Pittsburgh Gladiators of the Arena Football League.

References

External links
Just Sports Stats
College stats
Fanbase profile

Living people
1963 births
Players of American football from Texas
American football defensive backs
African-American players of American football
Texas A&M Aggies football players
Houston Oilers players
Pittsburgh Gladiators players
People from Nacogdoches, Texas
National Football League replacement players
21st-century African-American people
20th-century African-American sportspeople